Ronald Leslie Barnard (24 December 1927 – 13 June 1981) was a Bermudian politician for the United Bermuda Party. He was a president of the Bermuda Bar Association. He was a Rhodes Scholar.

References

United Bermuda Party politicians
20th-century Bermudian lawyers
1981 deaths
1927 births
Bermudian Rhodes Scholars